In mathematics, specifically in graph theory and number theory, a hydra game is a single-player iterative mathematical game played on a mathematical tree called a hydra where, usually, the goal is to cut off the hydra's "heads" while the hydra simultaneously expands itself. Hydra games can be used to generate large numbers or infinite ordinals or prove the strength of certain mathematical theories.

Unlike their combinatorial counterparts like TREE and SCG, no search is required to compute these fast-growing function values – one must simply keep applying the transformation rule to the tree until the game says to stop.

Introduction 
A simple hydra game can be defined as follows:

 A hydra is a finite rooted tree, which is a network of points and lines with no loops and a single starting point known as the root.
 The player selects a leaf node  and a natural number  at each stage. A leaf node is a point with only one line connected to it that is not the root.
 Remove the leaf . Let  be 's parent. Nothing else happens if . Return to stage 2.
Return to stage 2.

Even though the hydra may grow by an unbounded number  of leaves at each turn, the game will eventually end in finitely many steps: if  is the greatest distance between the root and the leaf, and  the number of leaves at this distance, induction on  can be used to demonstrate that the player will always kill the hydra. If , removing the leaves can never cause the hydra to grow, so the player wins after  turns. Since moves of the first kind are also identical to moves in a game with depth , the induction hypothesis tells us that after finitely many such moves, the player will have no choice but to choose a leaf at depth . No move introduces new nodes at this depth, so this entire process can only repeat up to  times, after which there are no more leaves at depth  and the game now has depth (at most) . Invoking the induction hypothesis again, we find that the player must eventually win overall.

While this shows that the player will win eventually, it can take a very long time. As an example, consider the following algorithm. Pick the rightmost leaf and set  the first time,  the second time, and so on, always increasing  by one.

Kirby–Paris and Buchholz hydras 
The Kirby–Paris hydra is defined by altering the fourth rule of the hydra defined above.

4KP: Assume  is the parent of  if . Return to stage 2.

Instead of adding only new leaves, this rule adds duplicates of an entire subtree. Keeping everything else the same, this time  requires  turn,  requires  steps,  requires  steps and  requires more steps than Graham's number.

This is not the most powerful hydra. The Buchholz hydra is a more potent hydra. It entails a labelled tree.

 A hydra is a labelled tree with finite roots. The root should be labelled .
  Choose a leaf node  and a natural number  at each stage.
  Remove the leaf . Let  be 's parent. Nothing else happens if . Return to stage 2.
Return to stage 2.
Return to stage 2.
Such a node exists because all nodes adjacent to the root are labelled . Take a copy of the subtree with root . Replace  with this subtree. Go back to stage 2.

Surprisingly, even though the hydra can grow enormously taller, this sequence always ends.

More about KP hydras 
For Kirby–Paris hydras, the rules are simple: start with a hydra, which is an unordered unlabelled rooted tree . At each stage, the player chooses a leaf node  to chop and a non-negative integer . If  is a child of the root , it is removed from the tree and nothing else happens that turn. Otherwise, let  be 's parent, and  be 's parent. The game ends when the hydra is reduced to a single node.

This could alternatively expressed using strings of brackets:

 Pick an empty pair  and a non-negative integer .
 Delete the pair, and if its parent is not the outermost pair, take its parent and append  copies of it.

Next is a list of values of :

More about Buchholz hydras 

The Buchholz hydra game is a hydra game in mathematical logic, a single player game based on the idea of chopping pieces off a mathematical tree. The hydra game can be used to generate a rapidly growing function , which eventually dominates all provably total recursive functions. It is an extension of Kirby-Paris hydras. What we use to obtain a fast-growing function is the same as Kirby-Paris hydras, but because Buchholz hydras grow not only in width but also in height,  has a much greater growth rate of :

 
 
 

This system can also be used to create an ordinal notation for infinite ordinals, e.g. .

See also 
Goodstein's theorem

References

External links 
 The hydra game
 Hercules and the hydra
 Kill the Mathematical Hydra by PBS Infinite Series

Graph theory
Graph theory objects
Number theory
Set theory